Of the many themes and involvements of Beanie Babies produced by Ty, Inc., one of them has been professional sports. Beanies have been used both to represent and promote various sports.

Automobile racing
In mid-2007, 22 NASCAR-themed beanies were introduced. Some are now retired. These included Racing Gold (in varying colors) and:
Mark Martin
Kurt Busch#2
Kyle Busch#5
Clint Bowyer#07
Kasey Kahne#9
Denny Hamlin#11
Ryan Newman#12
Greg Biffle#16
Matt Kenseth#17
J. J. Yeley#18
Elliott Sadler#19
Tony Stewart#20
Jeff Gordon#24
Casey Mears#25
Kevin Harvick#29
Jeff Burton#31
Jimmie Johnson#48
Carl Edwards#99

Baseball

Giveaways
At some Major League Baseball games, various beanies have been given away to some of the fans. At games that had Beanie Baby giveaways, attendance greatly increased.

HERE IS A LIST OF BEANIE BABIES GIVEN AWAY (SGA) AT BASEBALL GAMES:

5/18/97	                   Chicago Cubs	            Cubbie the Bear

9/06/97	                   Chicago Cubs	            Cubbie the Bear

9/18/97	                   Chicago Cubs	            Cubbie the Bear

3/10/98	                   New York Yankees	    Bones the Dog

5/03/98	                   Chicago Cubs	            Daisy the Cow (Harry Caray)

5/17/98	                   New York Yankees	 Valentino the Bear

5/22/98	                   St. Louis Cardinals	 Stretch the Ostrich

5/31/98	                   Detroit Tigers	 Stripes the Tiger

5/31/98	                   Milwaukee Brewers	 Batty the Bat

5/31/98	Kansas City Royals	Roary the Lion

6/14/98	Arizona Diamondbacks	Hissy the Snake

7/07/98	Colorado Rockies	Glory the Bear

7/12/98	Chicago White Sox	Blizzard the Tiger

7/12/98	New York Mets	Batty the Bat

7/26/98	Tampa Bay Devil Rays	Weenie the Dachshund

7/31/98	Minnesota Twins	Lucky the Ladybug

8/04/98	Texas Rangers	Pugsly the Pug

8/09/98	New York Yankees	Stretch the Ostrich

8/14/98	St. Louis Cardinals	Mac the Cardinal

8/14/98	San Diego Padres	Waves the Whale

8/16/98	Houston Astros	Derby the Horse

8/16/98	Cincinnati Reds	Rover the Dog

8/19/98	Atlanta Braves	Chip the Cat

8/22/98	New York Mets	Curly the Bear

8/23/98	Tampa Bay Devil Rays	Pinky the Flamingo

8/30/98	San Francisco Giants	Tuffy the Dog

9/02/98	Atlanta Braves	Pugsly the Pug

9/05/98	Seattle Mariners	Chocolate the Moose

9/06/98	Oakland Athletics	Peanut the Elephant

9/06/98	Anaheim Athletics	Mel the Koala

9/06/98	Toronto Blue Jays	Rocket the Bluejay 

9/08/98	Chicago Cubs	Blackie the Bear

9/13/98	Chicago Cubs	Gracie the Swan

9/14/98	St. Louis Cardinals	Smoochy the Frog

4/11/99	San Francisco Giants	Slippery the Seal

4/25/99	Chicago Cubs	Sammy the Bear

5/30/99	New York Mets	Valentina the Bear

6/12/99	Milwaukee Brewers	Early the Robin

6/18/99	Minnesota Twins	Hippie the Bunny

6/19/99 Cincinnati Reds Scorch the Dragon

7/03/99  Houston Astros    Goatee the Goat 

7/11/99	Detroit Tigers	Kuku the Cockatoo

7/18/99	Houston Astros	Tiny the Chihuahua

8/05/99	Chicago Cubs	Erin the Bear

8/15/99	New York Yankees	Millennium the Bear

9/01/99	Oakland Athletics	Peace the Bear

9/05/99	Texas Rangers	Luke the Dog

9/06/99	Kansas City Royals	Fortune the Panda

9/26/99	Chicago Cubs	Millennium the Bear

9/10/00 Chicago Cubs    Aurora the Polar Bear

5/20/01	Chicago Cubs	Addison the Bear

5/04/03	Chicago Cubs	Dusty the Bear

Beanies representing baseball players
Mac the cardinal, in honor of Mark McGwire, introduced in 1999. A Beanie Buddy version was later made and simply called "Cardinal."
Rocket the blue jay, in honor of Roger Clemens, introduced in 1998. A Teenie Beanie version was #5 in the 1999 series.
Sammy the bear, in honor of Sammy Sosa, introduced in 1999. A Pillow Pal called "Sherbert" was introduced later the same year that was similar in style.

Addison
Addison the bear was first introduced at a Cubs game on May 20, 2001, a game at which the Cubs beat the Diamondbacks 6-5. A total of 10,000 were given away to children 13 and under. It was not until after this game that addison was introduced to retailers.

Soccer

Kicks
Kicks the bear, introduced early in 1999, was the first beanie to represent a sport. A Beanie Buddy version of Kicks was made in 2000.

Champion
Champion was a bear made in 2002 in 32 versions, representing 32 countries in the World Cup. The version for any particular country was retired on the day that country was eliminated from the World Cup tournament. The hand tag of each Champion bear provided information on that country's team. All versions were introduced on April 4, 2002. None have birthdays.

References

Beanie Babies